Established in 1898, the Shawinigan Water & Power Company was one of the dominant, privately owned hydroelectric companies in Canada until 1963, when it became a part of Hydro-Québec.

History
Shawinigan Water & Power Company was founded on January 15, 1898 by American businessman John Edward Aldred (who was the president) and John Joyce, and then joined by Andrew Frederick Gault, H. H. Melville, Thomas McDougall, and Louis-Joseph Forget. The company was named for where it was based: Shawinigan, Quebec.

Power assets
The company established various power station over the history of the company. Six power plants were built along the Saint-Maurice River in the 1920s
 Shawinigan 1 7.5MW (c. 1901) – built at what is now Shawinigan Falls. Shawinigan-1 ceased production in the early 1950s.
 Shawinigan 2 200MW (1911–1929) 
 Shawinigan 3 194MW (1946–1948) 
 La Gabelle 129MW (1924–1931)
 Rapide-Blanc 204MW (c. 1930)
 La Trenche 302MW (c. 1950)
 Beaumont 270MW (1958–1959)

In 1956 the company had total generating capacity at 1284 MW from the six active power stations.

Shawinigan Water & Power also generated power from two subsidiaries:

 Quebec Power Company – 31.1MW from six stations near Quebec City
 Southern Canada Power Company Limited – 43.4 MW from five stations on St. Francis River and other tributaries in the Eastern Townships

Clients

 Shawinigan Carbide
 Belgo Pulp and Paper Mills

See also
History of Hydro-Québec
Edmond Thibaudeau
List of hydroelectric stations in Quebec
Gouin Reservoir
Saint-Maurice River
 Tracy Thermal Generating Station

References

Hydroelectric power companies of Canada
Defunct electric power companies of Canada
Hydro-Québec
1898 establishments in Quebec
Canadian companies established in 1898
1963 disestablishments in Quebec